The Pacific spiny rat (Proechimys decumanus) is a species of rodent in the family Echimyidae. It is found in Ecuador and Peru.

Phylogeny
Morphological characters and mitochondrial cytochrome b DNA sequences showed that P. decumanus represents one independent evolutionary lineage within the genus Proechimys, without clear phylogenetic affinity for any of the 6 major groups of species.

References

Proechimys
Mammals described in 1899
Taxa named by Oldfield Thomas
Taxonomy articles created by Polbot